The Walter Gray House is a historic house in rural southeastern Stone County, Arkansas. It is a single-story dogtrot house with an addition to its rear. It is a wood-frame structure with weatherboard siding, with a hip-roof porch extending across its front facade, supported by chamfered posts. At its west end is a chimney built out of square pieces of sawn stone, laid to present a veneer-like facade. An L-shaped porch wraps around the rear addition. The house was built in 1910 by Walter Gray, a local farmer, and represents the continued use of this traditional form of architecture into the 20th century.

The house was listed on the National Register of Historic Places in 1985.

See also
National Register of Historic Places listings in Stone County, Arkansas

References

Houses on the National Register of Historic Places in Arkansas
Houses completed in 1910
Houses in Stone County, Arkansas
National Register of Historic Places in Stone County, Arkansas